Grevillea nudiflora is a species of flowering plant in the family Proteaceae and is endemic to the south coast of Western Australia. It is a prostrate to low, spreading shrub, usually with linear leaves, and with small groups of red and yellow flowers often close to the ground on long flowering stems.

Description

TaxonomyGrevillea nudiflora was first formally described in 1856 by Carl Meissner in de Candolle's Prodromus Systematis Naturalis Regni Vegetabilis from specimens collected by James Drummond in the Swan River Colony. The specific epithet (nudiflora) means "bare-flowered".

Distribution and habitat
This grevillea grows in woodland, forest and heath from near Albany to Cape Arid National Park and inland as far as Mount Barker and Ravensthorpe in the Esperance Plains, Jarrah Forest and Mallee bioregions of southern Western Australia.

Conservation statusGrevillea nudiflora'' is listed as "not threatened" by the Western Australian Government Department of Parks and Wildlife

See also
 List of Grevillea species

References

nudiflora
Endemic flora of Western Australia
Eudicots of Western Australia
Proteales of Australia
Taxa named by Carl Meissner
Plants described in 1856